Nalo Hopkinson (born 20 December 1960) is a Jamaican-born Canadian speculative fiction writer and editor.  Her novels (Brown Girl in the Ring, Midnight Robber, The Salt Roads, The New Moon's Arms) and short stories such as those in her collection Skin Folk often draw on Caribbean history and language, and its traditions of oral and written storytelling.

Hopkinson has edited two fiction anthologies (Whispers From the Cotton Tree Root: Caribbean Fabulist Fiction and Mojo: Conjure Stories). She was the co-editor with Uppinder Mehan for the anthology So Long Been Dreaming: Postcolonial Visions of the Future, and with Geoff Ryman for Tesseracts 9.

Hopkinson defended George Elliott Clarke's novel Whylah Falls on the CBC's Canada Reads 2002. She was the curator of Six Impossible Things, an audio series of Canadian fantastical fiction on CBC Radio One.

As of 2013, she lives and teaches in Riverside, California. In 2020, Hopkinson was named the 37th Damon Knight Grand Master.

Early life and education
Nalo Hopkinson was born 20 December 1960 in Kingston, Jamaica, to Freda and Muhammed Abdur-Rahman Slade Hopkinson. She grew up in Guyana, Trinidad, and Canada. She was raised in a literary environment; her mother was a library technician and her father a Guyanese poet, playwright and actor who also taught English and Latin. By virtue of this upbringing, Hopkinson had access to writers like Derek Walcott during her formative years, and could read Kurt Vonnegut's works by the age of six. Hopkinson's writing is influenced by the fairy and folk tales she read at a young age, which included Afro-Caribbean stories like Anansi, as well as Western works like Gulliver's Travels, the Iliad, the Odyssey; she was also known to have read the works of Shakespeare around the time she was reading Homer. Though she lived in Connecticut briefly during her father's tenure at Yale University, Hopkinson has said that the culture shock from her move to Toronto from Guyana at the age of 16 was something "to which [she's] still not fully reconciled". She lived in Toronto from 1977 to 2011 before moving to Riverside, California where she works as Professor of Creative Writing at University of California Riverside.

Hopkinson has a Masters of Arts degree in Writing Popular Fiction from Seton Hill University, where she studied with her mentor and instructor, science fiction writer James Morrow. She has learning disabilities.

Career
Before working as a professor, Hopkinson held jobs in libraries, worked as a government culture research officer, and held the position of grants officer at the Toronto Arts Council. She has taught writing at various programs around the world, including stints as writer-in-residence at Clarion East, Clarion West and Clarion South. Publishing and writing was stopped for six years due to a serious illness that prevented her from working. Severe anemia, caused by fibroids as well as a vitamin D deficiency, led to financial difficulties and ultimately homelessness for two years prior to being hired by UC Riverside.

In 2011, Hopkinson was hired as an associate professor in creative writing with an emphasis on science fiction, fantasy, and magical realism at University of California, Riverside. She became a full professor in 2014.

As an author, Hopkinson often uses themes of Caribbean folklore, Afro-Caribbean culture, and feminism. She is historically conscious and uses knowledge from growing up in Caribbean communities in her writing, including the use of Creole and character backgrounds from Caribbean countries including Trinidad and Jamaica. In addition, Hopkinson consistently writes about subjects including race, class, and sexuality. Through her work, particularly in Midnight Robber, Hopkinson addresses differences in cultures as well as social issues such as child and sexual abuse.

Hopkinson has been a key speaker and guest of honor at multiple science fiction conventions. She is one of the founding members of the Carl Brandon Society and serves on the board.

Hopkinson's favorite writers include Samuel R. Delany, Tobias S. Buckell, and Charles Saunders. In addition, inspiration for her novels often comes from songs or poems with Christina Rossetti's poem "Goblin Market" serving as the inspiration for Sister Mine. Personal hobbies include sewing, cooking, gardening, and fabric design. Hopkinson designs fabrics based on historical photos and illustrations.

Awards
Hopkinson was the recipient of the 1999 John W. Campbell Award for Best New Writer and the Ontario Arts Council Foundation Award for Emerging Writers.

Brown Girl in the Ring was nominated for the Philip K. Dick Award in 1998, and received the Locus Award for Best First Novel. In 2008 it was a finalist in Canada Reads, produced by the Canadian Broadcasting Corporation.

Midnight Robber was shortlisted for the James R. Tiptree Jr. Memorial Award in 2000 and nominated for the Hugo Award for Best Novel in 2001.

Skin Folk received the World Fantasy Award and the Sunburst Award for Canadian Literature of the Fantastic in 2003.

The Salt Roads received the Gaylactic Spectrum Award for positive exploration of queer issues in speculative fiction for 2004, presented at the 2005 Gaylaxicon. It was also nominated for the 2004 Nebula Award.

In 2008, The New Moon's Arms received the Prix Aurora Award (Canada's reader-voted award for science fiction and fantasy) and the Sunburst Award for Canadian Literature of the Fantastic, making her the first author to receive the Sunburst Award twice. This book was also nominated for the 2007 Nebula Award for Best Novel.

In 2020, Hopkinson was named the 37th Damon Knight Grand Master by the Science Fiction and Fantasy Writers of America.

In 2022, Hopkinson’s “Broad Dutty Water: A Sunken Story” was awarded the Theodore Sturgeon Memorial Award for the best science fiction short story published the previous year, from the University of Kansas Center for the Study of Science Fiction.

Works

Novels
 Brown Girl in the Ring (1998)
 Midnight Robber (2000)
 The Salt Roads (2003)
 The New Moon's Arms (2007)
 The Chaos (2012) (Young adult fiction)
 Sister Mine (2013)
 Under Glass (2001)

Collections and anthologies
  Whispers from the Cotton Tree Root: Caribbean Fabulist Fiction (2000, anthology)
 Skin Folk (2001) (short stories)
 Mojo: Conjure Stories (2003, anthology)
 So Long Been Dreaming (2004, anthology)
 Report From Planet Midnight (2012) (short stories, interview and speech)
 Falling in Love With Hominids (2015) (short stories)

Short fiction (first publications only)
 "Slow Cold Chick" in anthology Northern Frights 5 (1998)
 "A Habit of Waste" in anthology Women of Other Worlds: Excursions through Science Fiction and Feminism (1999)
 "Precious" in anthology Silver Birch, Blood Moon (1999)
 "The Glass Bottle Trick" in anthology Whispers From the Cotton Tree Root: Caribbean Fabulist Fiction (2000)
 "Greedy Choke Puppy" and  "Ganger (Ball Lightning)" in anthology Dark Matter: A Century of Speculative Fiction From the African Diaspora
 "Midnight Robber" (excerpt from novel) reprinted in Young Bloods: Stories from Exile 1972–2001 (2001)
 "Delicious Monster" in anthology Queer Fear II (2002)
 "Shift" in journal Conjunctions: the New Wave Fabulists.
 "Herbal" in The Bakkanthology
 "Whose Upward Flight I Love" reprinted in African Voices
 "The Smile on the Face" in anthology Girls Who Bite Back: Witches, Mutants, Slayers and Freaks (2004)

Comic book series 

 The Sandman Universe: House of Whispers (DC/Vertigo) (2018- )

See also
 Works by Nalo Hopkinson
Nalo Hopkinson papers at the Special Collections and University Archives of University of California, Riverside

References

Further reading
 "Making the Impossible Possible: An Interview with Nalo Hopkinson" in Alondra Nelson, ed. Afrofuturism: A Special Issue of Social Text. Duke University Press. .

External links

 
 
 Nalo Hopkinson at The Encyclopedia of Science Fiction

1960 births
Living people
Black Canadian writers
Canadian fantasy writers
Canadian horror writers
Canadian science fiction writers
Canadian women novelists
SFWA Grand Masters
John W. Campbell Award for Best New Writer winners
Fabulists
Jamaican expatriates in Canada
Jamaican expatriates in the United States
Jamaican LGBT writers
Canadian LGBT novelists
Seton Hill University alumni
Women science fiction and fantasy writers
Afrofuturist writers
Women horror writers
World Fantasy Award-winning writers
Black Canadian women
Black speculative fiction authors
Jamaican women novelists
20th-century Canadian novelists
21st-century Canadian novelists
20th-century Jamaican novelists
21st-century Jamaican novelists
Black Canadian LGBT people
People from Kingston, Jamaica
Canadian people of Guyanese descent
Guyanese women novelists
20th-century Canadian women writers
21st-century Canadian women writers
Inkpot Award winners
21st-century Canadian LGBT people
20th-century Canadian LGBT people